The Lakshadweep Police is the law enforcement agency for the union territory of Lakshadweep, India.

Organizational structure
Lakshadweep Police comes under direct control of the Department of Home Affairs, Government of Lakshadweep.
The Lakshadweep Police is headed by the Inspector General of Police (IGP).
The administrator of Lakshadweep is the ex-officio Inspector General of Police of Lakshadweep Police.

References

Government of Lakshadweep
State law enforcement agencies of India
Government agencies with year of establishment missing